Anemone cylindrica is an upright growing, clump forming herbaceous flowering plant species in the buttercup family Ranunculaceae. When the fruits, called achenes, are ripe they have gray-white colored, densely woolly styles, that allow them to blow away in the wind.

Anemone cylindrica is native to north central North America where it can be found growing in prairies, in dry open woods, along roadsides and in pastures.

Anemone cylindrica is one of several plants known as thimbleweed.

References

cylindrica
Flora of Canada
Flora of the United States